Maurie is a masculine given name, sometimes a diminutive form (hypocorism) of Maurice. People named Maurie include:

 Maurie Beasy (1896–1979), Australian rules footballer
 Maurie Collins (1876–1943), Australian rules footballer
 Maurie Connell (1902–1975), Australian rules footballer
 Maurie Considine (born 1932), former Australian rules footballer
 Maurie Daigneau (born 1950), American former college and World Football League quarterback
 Maurie Dunstan (1929–1991), Australian rules footballer
 Maurie Fa'asavalu (born 1980), Samoan rugby union player
 Maurie Fields (1926–1995), Australian actor, vaudeville performer and stand-up comedian
 Maurie Gibb (1914–2000), Australian rules footballer
 Maurie Hearn (1912–2004), Australian rules footballer
 Maurie Herring (1879–1962), Australian rules footballer
 Maurie Hunter (1904–1987), Australian rules footballer
 Maurie Johnson (1907–2000), Australian rules footballer
 Maurie Keane (1923–2014), Australian politician
 Maurie O'Connell (1917–2005), Australian rules footballer
 Maurie Sankey (1940–1965), Australian rules footballer
 Maurie Sheahan (1905–1956), Australian rules footballer
 Maurie Sheehy (1893–1961), Australian politician
 Maurie Wood (born 1944), former Australian rules footballer
 Maurie Young (born 1937), former Australian rules footballer

See also
 Maury (name), a given name and a surname
 Morrie, another given name

Masculine given names
Hypocorisms